Penrnock is an unincorporated community in New Castle County, Delaware, United States. Pennrock is located northeast of Silverside Road and southeast of Interstate 95 to the northeast of Wilmington.

References 

Unincorporated communities in New Castle County, Delaware
Unincorporated communities in Delaware